Michael "Mick" Moran (born 16 August 1983) is a former rugby league player. He played for the South Sydney Rabbitohs.

NRL career
Moran debuted in the 2005 season, in South Sydney's round 9 match against the St. George Illawarra Dragons. He showed promise in his first season, playing 11 games, and signed on to another contract until the end of 2007 midway through the year. However, he failed to play a single game in the 2006 season. His contract was terminated midway through the 2006 season more than a year before it was due to expire for unspecified disciplinary reasons.

Newcastle Rugby League career
Moran later signed on with the Maitland Pickers in the Newcastle Rugby League, winning two Grand Finals with them, in 2010 and 2011. Special attention was drawn to his performance in the 2011 Grand Final, where he kicked the winning field goal during Golden point. He later moved to the Macquarie Scorpions. Moran retired from rugby league prior to the 2016 season.

References

South Sydney Rabbitohs players
Australian rugby league players
1983 births
Living people
Rugby league halfbacks